Threnosia myochroa, the heath footman, is a moth in the subfamily Arctiinae. It was described by Turner in 1940. It is found in Australia, where it has been recorded from New South Wales and Victoria.

The wingspan is about 20 mm. The forewings are brown with a zigzag submarginal band. The hindwings are paler brown.

References

Moths described in 1940
Lithosiini